2009 Regional League Division 2 Southern Region is the 3rd Level League in Thailand. The first season was played in 2009, starting in March and finishing in August.

The league winners Narathiwat entered the Regional League Championships 2009.

Member clubs

Stadia and locations

League table

Results

See also
2009 Regional League Division 2 North Eastern Region
2009 Regional League Division 2 Northern Region
2009 Regional League Division 2 Central & Eastern Region
2009 Regional League Division 2 Bangkok Metropolitan Region

References

External links
 Football Association of Thailand

Regional League South Division seasons
Sou